Sant'Ippolito is a comune (municipality) in the Province of Pesaro e Urbino in the Italian region Marche, located about  west of Ancona and about  south of Pesaro.

Geography
Sant'Ippolito borders the following municipalities:  Fossombrone, Fratte Rosa, Montefelcino, Orciano di Pesaro, Serrungarina, Terre Roveresche.

References

External links

Cities and towns in the Marche